The Museum of Art and Photography (MAP) is a private art museum based in Bangalore, India that is a custodian to a collection of Indian art, textiles, photography, craft, and design objects spanning from the twelfth century to the present. 

MAP opened its doors to the public on 18th February, 2023 as a private art museum.

In December 2020, MAP launched a digital museum, that offers a virtual interactive experience to viewers.

Collections 
MAP has more than 20,000 artworks, predominantly from the Indian subcontinent in its collection that are organised into six departments: Modern and Contemporary Art, Photography, Living Traditions, Popular Culture, Pre-Modern Art and Textiles, Craft and Design. The collection includes works by Indian modernists, as well as Indian artists. In addition, the vast collection includes photographs, and works by indigenous artists.

In 2017, Abhishek Poddar, the founder of the MAP, donated more than 7000 artworks to the museum.

Abhishek Poddar 

Abhishek Poddar (born 1968), an Indian industrialist, philanthropist, and art collector, is the founder of the Museum of Art and Photography, Bengaluru. Besides serving on various boards and committees in India, Poddar also serves on the advisory committees of the India-Europe Foundation for New Dialogues, headquartered in Rome and on the Lincoln Centre Global Advisory Council. He has been collecting art since high school and has created a significant collection of South Asian art, craft and antiquities, including modern and contemporary art and photography, a majority of which he has donated to the museum's collection. In December 2016, Christie’s also held an auction of a large chunk of the Poddar family’s personal collection, and the funds acquired were used to drive forward his vision of establishing south India's first major private art museum.  

He was named as one of Asia’s 2018 Heroes of Philanthropy by Forbes Magazine. He is also the director of Sua Explosives & Accessories, and the managing director of Matheson Bosanquet.

Publications 
In December 2018, MAP published a book on Gond-Pardhan artist, Jangarh Singh Shyam, written by Dr. Jyotindra Jain. The book includes transcripts of his final letter to his wife, Nankushiya, and his mother, Adharabai. The letter was written a few days before his death and contained his explanation of his frame of mind.

Building 
The museum is located on Kasturba Road in Bengaluru. The designs for the 44,000 square feet museum include five galleries, an auditorium, research library, classroom, restoration lab, storage, and sculpture garden. Designed by Mathew & Ghosh Architects, the construction was overseen by an architectural committee that included Rahul Mehrotra, Mahrukh Tarapor, and the late Martand Singh.

Art (is) Life Festival 
In December 2020, MAP launched their digital museum with a week-long, online festival entitled, Art (is) Life, that opened with a virtual, sensorial exploration of the museum building through an amalgamation of art, poetry, and dance. The festival featured known cultural figures such as Javed Akhtar, actor Shabana Azmi, classical dancer Malavika Sarukkai, film and theatre professional Arundhati Nag, art historian B. N. Goswamy, filmmaker Nandita Das, visual artist Jitish Kallat, and singer Kavita Seth. 

The remaining days of the festival featured daily 45-minute programs that took viewers through different selected departments of the MAP collection and featured stories from the collections, performances, and collaborations with international museums.

Exhibitions 
As part of the digital launch, MAP launched a new online exhibitions section on its website, with three shows on the studio photographer, Suresh Punjabi, from Nagda in Madhya Pradesh; on the life and work of the Bhil artist and Padma Shri awardee, Bhuri Bai; and on Tallur LN's work Interference. The museum releases a new online exhibition every month, with the 2022 ones being on kantha textiles, the South Asian artist Zoya Siddiqui, Bangalore-based artist Shanthamani M., and an exhibition that looks at the intersection of food and art.

Events 
MAP hosts digital events every month that range from talks with leading cultural figures, including Sebastião Salgado, Marina Abramović, Vidya Dehejia, Paul Fernandes, and Navina Najat Haidar, as well as workshops, masterclasses, panel discussions, and exhibition tours. A core aspect of MAP's mission is to take art into the heart of the community. Through its online events that are mostly free to attend and equipped with Indian Sign Language interpretation, MAP reaches out to diverse audiences. After the onset of the countrywide lockdown in March 2020, MAP pivoted the museum’s programming and outreach efforts to the digital space. In 2021, the museum launched two expert series for museum professionals: the Deep Dive, which brings together historians and curators such as Dr. Sook-Kyung Lee of Tate Modern, to speak on a wide range of subjects; and Director's Cut, which features directors from museums around the world in conversation with MAP's director, Kamini Sawhney. Cecilia Alemani of the High Line, New York, and Victoria Noorthoorn of the Museo de Arte Moderno de Buenos Aires have been featured in the Director's Cut series.

Education 
Education in art and culture is one of MAP’s key focus areas. The education team at MAP regularly curates a variety of programs that cater to a wide range of audiences, from young children and teens to adults. From workshops for school students or capacity building for teachers, to masterclasses for adults and open-to-all public lectures, MAP hopes to highlight the holistic role of art and culture in one's life and to offer audiences new ways of engaging with the MAP collection. As part of its education initiative, MAP launched Discover MAP, which comprise art packs for children that uncover an artist's body of work, or a movement in art history, such as Arpita Singh, Portraiture, Manjit Bawa, Jamini Roy, and more. With child-friendly activities and mode of storytelling, the packs are a fun way to get children interested in art.

MAP Academy 
The MAP Academy is an education initiative by the museum. The academy aims to be a comprehensive resource for Indian art history to date and is divided into three main verticals: a free online encyclopedia of Indian art, a range of online courses on Indian art history, and a database of existing learning resources on Indian art history.

Museums Without Borders 
With the aim of linking collections globally, Museums Without Borders is a unique digital collaboration between MAP and institutions in India and throughout the world. Ranging from six to ten minutes, each episode in this series juxtaposes an artwork from MAP with an object from a partner museum, exploring commonalities and differences in style, subject, or narrative. By 2022, MAP had released ten episodes, featuring works from the British Museum, London, Detroit Institute of Arts, Museum of Fine Arts, Boston, Victoria and Albert Museum, London, Maharaja Sawai Man Singh II Museum, Jaipur, Partition Museum, Amritsar and others.

Digital Experiences 
In a 2020 collaboration with Accenture, MAP launched India's first conversational digital persona of the celebrated artist, MF Husain. A unique digital experience created using artificial intelligence (AI) to engage audiences of all ages, Husain’s persona gives a glimpse into the life and work of one of India’s most compelling artists. Viewers simply ask Husain’s digital twin a question regarding his early life, family, or career and receive a simulated response from the digital persona. The Husain AI experience is available on the museum's website and also as a 3-D hologram at the museum’s physical space. The merging of art and technology is one of the cornerstones in MAP's vision.  

References

External links 

Google Arts & Culture - MAP Partnership

Museums in Bangalore
Museums in India
Online encyclopedias